Chase: Hollywood Stunt Driver is a 2002 videogame for the Xbox, developed by I-Imagine Interactive and published by BAM! Entertainment. It is a film stuntman simulator in the style of contemporary game Stuntman.

Chase is one of many games to make use of the Xbox's customisable soundtrack capabilities.

Story
Players take on the role of professional stuntwoman Chase Corrada as she performs vehicular stunts for various films. Each film is directed by "Mr Chin", a famous Hong Kong director noted for his spectacular chase scenes, and who had previously worked with Griffin Corrada, Chase's famous stuntman father. In each film, Chase finds herself working/competing with rival stuntman Rick Baen.

Gameplay

Career Mode
"Career Mode" takes place across four films, with the player performing stunts for four scenes in each film. The films are:
The Unchaseables - a Gangster film
Chase of the Triad IV - A Hong Kong action film
Chasing Survival - a post-apocalyptic film in the style of Mad Max
The Spy Who Chased Me - a stylish spy film in the style of the James Bond films
"Career Mode" ends with the "Final Scene": an illegal Formula One street race between Chase and Rick.

After successful completion of a "scene", players then view the "scene" they just "filmed" as it would appear in a film (with things such as cameramen and hidden ramps "edited out"). Players can opt to save these filmed scenes and rewatch them in "Replay Theatre".

Challenge Mode
"Challenge Mode" involves players attempting to reach the high score in one of three disciplines:
"Jump Challenge" - players attempt to jump their vehicles over an increasing number of buses.
"Stunt Point Challenge" - players attempt to perform as many stunts as possible within a time limit.
"Race Challenge" - players Race against Baen.

Multiplayer
Three multiplayer modes are available:
"Hit & Run" - a "tag"-style game in which players attempt to avoid being "it" when the timer runs out.
"Stunt Point Duel" - a multiplayer variant on "Stunt Point Challenge".
"Stunt Race" - a multiplayer variant on "Race Challenge".

External links
Official Website (via Internet Archive)
Chase:Hollywood Stunt Driver at IGN

2002 video games
Action video games
Racing video games
Filmmaking video games
North America-exclusive video games
Video games developed in South Africa
Video games featuring female protagonists
Xbox-only games
Xbox games